In the Malay epic Sejarah Melayu, Hang Nadim (Jawi: هڠ نديم) Laksamana Hang Nadim was a warrior of the Johor-Riau during the Portuguese occupation of Malacca. He is the son of legendary Malacca Warrior Hang Jebat and foster son another legendary Malacca Warrior Hang Tuah. After the fall of Malacca to the Portuguese in 1511, Sultan Mahmud withdrew from Teloh Naming to Ulu Muar, then settled in Pagoh and Bentayan. Sultan Mahmud and his descendants built up the Johor Sultanate as the basis of Johor-Riau Empire based in Johore, the Riau Islands, Pahang and all those parts of the old Malacca Sultanate which was not occupied by the Portuguese. Although Malacca had fallen to the Portuguese, Sultan Mahmud and his son Sultan Ahmad had continuously sent his army to attack the Portuguese in Malacca from 1511 till 1526. Sultan Mahmud died in Kampar, Sumatra in 1528 and was known as Marhum Kampar. 

Appointment as Laksamana
When Laksamana Khoja Hassan died, Hang Nadim was appointed as the new Laksamana. Hang Nadim assisted Sultan Mahmud in the two attempts he made to recover his throne in 1519 and 1524.

In 1516, Hang Nadim attacked Malacca with the hope of recapturing it from the Portuguese, but the attack was unsuccessful. In 1524, Hang Nadim also besieged Malacca in the hope of preventing food reaching the town. The Portuguese were relieved by reinforcements from Goa.

Hang Nadim proved his leadership and heroism by defeating the Portuguese when they attacked Bintan and Kopak. His gallantry was highly esteemed by the Malays and the repeated attacks he mounted on the Portuguese weakened their fighting spirit and badly damaged their trade in Malacca.

Background
In the Sejarah Melayu, the boy who saved Temasek from the swordfishes is not given a name. The name Hang Nadim was only given to the character after later adaptions of the story publicized by popular culture.

Hang Nadim is the name of a character in the Sejarah Melayu, however that character appears in a different chapter and is unrelated to the story of the boy who saved Temasek from the swordfishes.

It is mentioned in the traditional accounts that the attacks were a curse because the reigning Maharaja had ordered the death of a pious man from Pasei called Tun Jana Khateb.

Solution
The initial plan of the raja to counter the attacks was to have his men stand in the sea and form a human barrier of legs along the shores of Temasek to protect the country. The number of swordfish were too numerous and it only cost more lives to be lost. After which, among the people, Hang Nadim spoke up and advised the ruler of Temasek, the Maharaja, to build the barrier with banana stems instead. The effort was successful as the swordfishes' snouts were trapped by the barricade of stems.

According to legend, the place, Tanjong Pagar in modern-day Singapore, takes its name from the barricade. In the Malay language, tanjong pagar or tanjung pagar means "cape of gates".

Backlash
The Maharaja was furious because he had been outwitted by a boy. So he decided to hire assassins to murder the boy. The boy lived on top of a hill so that night, the assassins murdered him in his sleep and all of his blood flowed into the hill, thus the name Bukit Merah (Malay for red hill).

Others
Also well-known is Laksamana Hang Nadim, the son of Hang Tuah and Malay warrior who on several occasions tried to recapture Melaka (Malacca) from the Portuguese. The Royal Malaysian Navy's Laksamana Class corvette KD Hang Nadim is named after Laksamana Hang Nadim. An airport in Batam, Indonesia is also named after it.

Film Director Omar Rojik directed an adaption of Hang Nadim's story as told in the Sejarah Melayu, the film is entitled "Singapura Dilanggar Todak" and was produced in 1962. This film ties together both the story of Tun Jana Khateb's visit and execution in Temasek and Hang Nadim's later heroic act in saving the people from the attacks of the swordfish.

References

Malay culture